The 21st Infantry Division (21-ya Pekhotnaya Diviziya) was an infantry formation of the Russian Imperial Army.

Organization
1st Brigade
81st His Imperial Highness Grand Duke George Mikhailovich's Apsheron Infantry Regiment
82nd His Imperial Highness Grand Duke Nicholas Mikhailovich's Dagestan Infantry Regiment
2nd Brigade
83rd Samur Infantry Regiment
84th Shirvan Infantry Regiment
21st Artillery Brigade

Commanders
1826-1828: Georgiy Evseevich Eristov
1865-1868: Ivan Davidovich Lazarev
1868-1871: Fyodor Radetzky
1913-1914: Samad bey Mehmandarov
1915: Mikhail Kvetsinsky

Chiefs of Staff
1856-1858: Fyodor Radetzky

Commanders of the 2nd Brigade
March-September 1908: Konstantin Lukich Gilchevsky

References

Infantry divisions of the Russian Empire
Military units and formations disestablished in 1918